Poliana Okimoto (born March 8, 1983) is a Brazilian long-distance swimmer.

Career
She was at the 2002 FINA World Swimming Championships (25 m) in Moscow, where she finished 18th in the 800-metre freestyle.

She won the Travessia dos Fortes in 2005.

Okimoto competed in the 2007 Pan American Games in Rio de Janeiro, in the first appearance of the marathon swimming, where she received the silver medal in the Women's 10K, the first Brazilian medal at this edition.

Okimoto finished 7th in the inaugural aquatic marathon (10 km race) at the 2008 Olympics.

She also swam at the 2008 Open Water World Championships in Seville, Spain.

In 2009, Okimoto won the marathon swimming World Cup, winning 9 of 11 stages held, becoming the first Brazilian champion of the sport.

At the 2009 World Aquatics Championships in Rome, obtained the bronze medal. With that, she broke a 15 years-fast for Brazil in the World Championships, and became the first Brazilian woman to win a medal in the competition's history. She was considered by Época magazine one of the 100 most influential Brazilians in 2009.

She was at the 2010 Pan Pacific Swimming Championships in Irvine, where she finished 20th in the 400-metre freestyle.

In 2010, she broke the short-course Brazilian records of the 800-metre freestyle (8:27.77)  and 1500-metre freestyle (16:09.04).

At the 2011 Pan American Games in Guadalajara, Okimoto repeated the 2007 result, and again won the silver.

In the 2012 Olympics in London Okimoto was unable to complete the race due to the water temperature, being disqualified. The frustration that followed led Okimoto to clinical depression and thoughts of abandoning the sport, before being convinced otherwise by among others her husband-coach Ricardo Cintra.

At the 2013 World Aquatics Championships, in Barcelona, Poliana had a historical participation. She won the silver medal in the Women's 5K race, and, some days later, became the World Champion in the 10K race. Finishing, in the team event, she won the bronze medal with the Brazilian team, along with Samuel de Bona and Allan do Carmo.

On August 12, 2013, Okimoto broke the Brazilian record in the 1500-metre freestyle, with a time of 16:26.90.

At the 2015 FINA World Championships in Kazan, Okimoto finished 6th in the 10 km marathon.

Okimoto initially finished fourth at the 10 km race at the 2016 Olympics hosted by Brazil. A disqualification of second placed Aurélie Muller upgraded her to the bronze, making Okimoto the first Brazilian woman to win a swimming Olympic medal.

The following year, Okimoto wound up absent of the 2017 World Championships, finishing third in the national 10 km qualifiers and skipping the 5 km ones.

See also 
List of Brazilian records in swimming

References

External links

 2008 Olympics profile

1983 births
Living people
Brazilian female long-distance swimmers
Olympic bronze medalists for Brazil
Olympic bronze medalists in swimming
Olympic swimmers of Brazil
Swimmers at the 2008 Summer Olympics
Swimmers at the 2012 Summer Olympics
Swimmers at the 2016 Summer Olympics
Swimmers from São Paulo
Swimmers at the 2007 Pan American Games
Swimmers at the 2011 Pan American Games
Brazilian people of Japanese descent
World Aquatics Championships medalists in open water swimming
Pan American Games silver medalists for Brazil
Medalists at the 2016 Summer Olympics
Pan American Games medalists in swimming
Medalists at the 2007 Pan American Games
Medalists at the 2011 Pan American Games
21st-century Brazilian women